Chapter One is a restaurant in Parnell Square in Dublin, Ireland. It is a fine dining restaurant that has been awarded two Michelin stars since 2022. It previously held one star between 2007 and 2021. The Michelin Guide awarded the restaurant the "Red M", indicating 'good food at a reasonable price', in the period 1996–2001.

The restaurant is located in the basement of the Dublin Writers Museum and the Irish Writers’ Centre. The name of the restaurant refers to that.

In 2007 and 2008 the restaurant was completely renovated and modernised. New rules for hygiene and working conditions made that necessary.

On May 21, 2021, The Irish Times announced that chef Mickael Viljanen had entered into a business partnership with head chef and owner Ross Lewis, and would take over as the head chef of Chapter One. Lewis stays on as co-owner.

Awards
Chapter One was awarded numerous awards and prizes during its existence. Here an overview from the last five years (2005–2010):
"Food & Wine" awards
 Best Restaurant - 2006, 2009, 2010
 Best Dublin Restaurant - 2008
 Best Chef - 2010
 Best Sommelier - 2009

RAI awards (Restaurants Association of Ireland)
 Best Restaurant - 2003, 2006, 2007, 2009, 2010, 2011, 2012
 Best Chef - 2008
 Best Chef Dublin - 2009
 Best Restaurant Dublin - 2009
 Best Wine List - 2009

Other awards
 Michelin Star - since 2007
 "The Dubliner Best Chefs" Chef - 2009
 Dubliner Magazine Restaurant of the Year - 2006 and 2008
 Baileys/Eurotoques Young Chef - Winner 2005

See also
List of Michelin starred restaurants in Ireland

Sources and references

External links
 
 Ireland Guide

Restaurants in Dublin (city)
Michelin Guide starred restaurants in Ireland
Parnell Square